The 2008 United States House of Representatives Elections in Florida were held on November 4, 2008 to determine who would represent the state of Florida in the United States House of Representatives. Representatives are elected for two-year terms; those elected served in the 111th Congress from January 4, 2009 until January 3, 2011.  The election coincided with the 2008 U.S. presidential election.

Florida had twenty-five seats in the House, apportioned according to the 2000 United States Census. Its delegation to the 110th Congress of 2007-2009 consisted of sixteen Republicans and nine Democrats. In 2008, Districts 8 and 24 changed party from Republican to Democratic, and District 16 changed party from Democratic to Republican. Florida's delegation to the 111th Congress therefore consisted of fifteen Republicans and ten Democrats, a net increase of one Democrat. CQ Politics had forecasted districts 8, 13, 15, 16, 18, 21, 22, 24 and 25 to be at some risk for the incumbent party.

The Primary election was held August 26, 2008, with a registration deadline of July 28, 2008. The General election was held November 4, 2008, with a registration deadline of October 6, 2008. Early voting in Florida begins 15 days before an election and ends on the second day before an election. In 2008, early voting ran from October 20 through November 2.

Overview 

All of the vote totals were copied from the Secretary of State of Florida's Website

Match-up summary

Congressional districts

District 1

Republican incumbent Jeff Miller has held this seat since winning a special election in 2001. He was challenged by Democrat Jim Bryan (campaign website), a Vietnam War veteran. CQ Politics forecasted the race as 'Safe Republican'.
Race ranking and details from CQ Politics
Campaign contributions from OpenSecrets

Results
Incumbent Jeff Miller retained his seat with about 70 percent of the vote.

District 2

Democratic incumbent Allen Boyd has held this seat since 1997. Other contestants in this race included Republican challenger Mark Mulligan and write-in candidate Robert Ortiz. CQ Politics forecasted the race as 'Safe Democrat'.
Race ranking and details from CQ Politics
Campaign contributions from OpenSecrets

Results
Allen Boyd was reelected with slightly under 62 percent of the vote.

District 3

Democratic incumbent Corrine Brown has held this seat since 1993 and ran unopposed in this election.
Race ranking and details from CQ Politics
Campaign contributions from OpenSecrets

District 4

Republican incumbent Ander Crenshaw has held this seat since 2001. He was challenged by Democrat Jay McGovern, an Iraq War veteran. CQ Politics forecasts the race as 'Safe Republican'.
Race ranking and details from CQ Politics
Campaign contributions from OpenSecrets

Results
Republican Ander Crenshaw was reelected with around 65 percent of the votes.

District 5

Republican incumbent Ginny Brown-Waite (campaign website), who has held this seat since 2003, was again challenged by Democrat John Russell (campaign website), who received 40% against Brown-Waite in the 2006 election. CQ Politics forecasted the race as 'Safe Republican'. (CPVI=R+5)

Brown-Waite attracted a serious primary challenger in this sprawling Nature Coast district. As of November, Jim King had already begun a media campaign attacking Brown-Waite from the right and appealing to the conservative Christians who exert a serious influence in the local Republican Party. While King was a longshot to unseat Brown-Waite, a lengthy and divisive primary campaign of this sort risks draining the incumbent's campaign resources, splintering her support, and causing her to take up more conservative stances that would appeal less to moderate voters in the general election.

Russell is a businessman, acute care nurse practitioner and local activist. He hoped to capitalize on Brown-Waite's difficult primary, her modest fundraising, and the recent demographic changes in this high-growth area. 
Race ranking and details from CQ Politics
Campaign contributions from OpenSecrets

Results
Ginny Brown-Waite retained her seat. She received around 61 percent of the vote, improving her showing against Russell in the 2006 election by slightly over 1 percentage point.

District 6

Republican incumbent Cliff Stearns has held this seat since 1989. He faced Democratic challenger Tim Cunha (campaign website). CQ Politics forecasts the race as 'Safe Republican'.
Race ranking and details from CQ Politics
Campaign contributions from OpenSecrets

Results
Incumbent Cliff Stearns was reelected with just under 61 percent of the votes.

District 7

Republican incumbent John Mica, representing the district since 1993, faced Democratic challenger, Faye Armitage (campaign website). CQ Politics forecasted the race as 'Safe Republican'.
Race ranking and details from CQ Politics
Campaign contributions from OpenSecrets

Results
Incumbent John Mica held his seat, gaining 62 percent of the votes.

District 8

Democratic nominee Alan Grayson challenged Republican incumbent Ric Keller, who had held the seat since 2001. On October 21, 2008, CQ Politics  switched its outlook on the race from "No Clear Favorite" to "Leans Democratic," citing the fact that there are now more registered Democrats that Republicans in Keller's district. George W. Bush had won the district in 2004 with 55% of the vote (CPVI=R+3).

In 2006, Keller, author of the "Cheeseburger Bill", was reelected by less than expected to Orlando businessman Charlie Stuart, who polled 46%. After the November 2006 election, Keller announced that he would break his 2000 pledge to serve only four terms. Todd Long, an Orlando attorney and radio talk show host, then announced he would challenge Keller in the Republican primary, promising to make an issue of the broken term-limits pledge. Greg Lewis and retired Marine Corps officer Bob Hering also announced they would challenge Keller in the primary, but they did not meet the qualifying requirements. The Keller-Long primary fight intensified over the summer, with Keller's term limit retraction, as well as his vote against The Surge making him increasingly vulnerable to defeat. However, just days before the August 26 primary, Keller sent out a mailer exposing Long's arrest record, a DUI, and another trespass warning. Keller squeaked by with a 53%-47% win in the GOP primary, but his reputation took a hit, as many saw the mailer as a political "dirty trick."

Grayson, an attorney who prosecutes war profiteers, had run unsuccessfully in the 2006 Democratic primary. In the 2008 primary, he faced large field, including Charlie Stuart, who had lost to Keller by six percentage points in 2006; Mike Smith, a former state prosecutor and current trial lawyer with Morgan & Morgan; Corbett Kroeler, an environmental activist; Quoc Ba Van, local weight-lifting champion and recent Emory Law School graduate.
Race ranking and details from CQ Politics
Campaign contributions from OpenSecrets

Results
Alan Grayson defeated incumbent Ric Keller, receiving 52 percent of the vote. This was one of two pickups for the Democratic Party in Florida, along with District 24. The general election was heated, with "mudslinging" and attack ads by both sides on television and in mailers. The race gained considerable national attention.

District 9

Republican freshman incumbent Gus Michael Bilirakis faced several opponents in this race. Challengers included Democrat Bill Mitchell, independents Richard Emmons and John Kalimnios, and write-in candidate Andrew Pasayan. CQ Politics forecasted the race as 'Safe Republican'.
Race ranking and details from CQ Politics
Campaign contributions from OpenSecrets

Results
Incumbent Gus Michael Bilirakis retained his seat, receiving around 62 percent of the votes.

District 10

Republican incumbent Bill Young, who has represented this district since 1971 and is currently the longest-serving Republican in the House, faced Dunedin Mayor Democrat Bob Hackworth and write in candidate Don Callahan. Bob Hackworth won the Democratic primary on August 26, 2008 with 46% of the vote, defeating Samm Simpson and Max Linn. CQ Politics forecasted the race as 'Safe Republican'.
Race ranking and details from CQ Politics
Campaign contributions from OpenSecrets

Results
Bill Young was reelected, receiving around 61 percent of the votes.

District 11

 
Freshman Democratic congresswoman Kathy Castor faced Republican challenger Eddie Adams, Jr. CQ Politics forecasted the race as 'Safe Democrat'.
Race ranking and details from CQ Politics
Campaign contributions from OpenSecrets

Results
Kathy Castor easily retained her seat with nearly 72 percent of the votes.

District 12

 
Republican incumbent Adam Putnam, who has held this seat since 2001, was challenged by Democrat and retired U.S. Navy Master Chief Petty Officer Doug Tudor. CQ Politics forecasted the race as 'Safe Republican'.
Race ranking and details from CQ Politics
Campaign contributions from OpenSecrets

Results
Adam Putnam was reelected, receiving 57.5 percent of the vote.

District 13

 
Freshman Republican incumbent Vern Buchanan (campaign website) was again challenged by Democratic banker Christine Jennings (campaign website). Former Democratic Congressional candidate Jan Schneider also filed, running as an Independent. This was expected to be a competitive race in 2008, though Buchanan was far ahead of Jennings in fundraising. CQ Politics forecasted the race as 'Leans Republican'. George W. Bush won 56% of the district's vote in 2004 (CPVI=R+4).

Buchanan was certified as having won in 2006 by a 369-vote margin over Jennings, but Jennings challenged the election in court. Although Buchanan was seated by the House, the House has made no final decision on the matter. In mid-July 2007, Jennings announced she would run again in 2008.  
Race ranking and details from CQ Politics
Campaign contributions from OpenSecrets
Buchanan (R-i) vs Jennings (D) polls from Pollster.com

Results
Vern Buchanan was reelected to a second term. In contrast to the 2006 election, Buchanan won by a convincing margin, receiving 55.5 percent of the vote.

District 14

 
Republican incumbent Connie Mack, holder of this seat since 2005, was challenged by Democrat Robert Neeld (campaign website), Independent Jeff George (campaign website) and Republican State Senator Burt Saunders (who ran as an Independent). CQ Politics forecasted the race as 'Safe Republican'.
Race ranking and details from CQ Politics
Campaign contributions from OpenSecrets

Results
Connie Mack was returned to Congress for a third term, receiving over 59 percent of the votes.

District 15

Seven-term Republican incumbent Dave Weldon had easily won re-election contests for a decade, but is retiring in 2008, leaving this Florida's only open House seat. Republican nominee State Senator Bill Posey, who was endorsed by Weldon and the Florida Republican Party, faced Democratic nominee physician Steve Blythe (campaign website). Independent candidates Frank Zilaitis and Trevor Lowing also ran for the seat. Libertarian Jeffrey Bouffard, a computer engineer and army veteran, also filed to run, but did not qualify for the ballot.  CQ Politics forecasted the race as 'Republican Favored'. George W. Bush won 57% of the vote here in 2004 (CPVI=R+4).
Race ranking and details from CQ Politics
Campaign contributions from OpenSecrets

Results
Bill Posey won the open seat with 53 percent of the vote. As a result, this seat remained under Republican control for the 111th Congress.

District 16

Republican nominee Tom Rooney faced Democratic incumbent Tim Mahoney.

This is normally a solidly Republican district, so consensus was that Mahoney's 50% to 48% win in 2006 could be attributed to the Mark Foley scandal. The Republican nominee Joe Negron's 2006 campaign was harmed by the fact that Foley's name remained on the ballot even though he was not a candidate, as his withdrawal from the race came too late to replace him on the ballot under Florida law. George W. Bush won this district by a 10-point margin in 2004 (CPVI=R+2).

Attorney Rooney won the Republican primary election against State Rep. Gayle Harrell and Palm Beach Gardens City Councilman Hal Valeche.

On October 12, 2008, it was revealed that Mahoney had an affair with a staffer, and had paid her $121,000 in a settlement to stave off a potential lawsuit. House Speaker Nancy Pelosi has called for an ethics inquiry. Two days later, CQ Politics changed their forecast on the race from "No Clear Favorite" to "Leans Republican".
Race ranking and details from CQ Politics
Campaign contributions from OpenSecrets

Results
Republican Tom Rooney, with 60 percent of the votes, defeated incumbent Congressman Tim Mahoney. This was the only district in Florida to switch from Democratic to Republican control in 2008.

District 17

Democratic three-term incumbent Kendrick Meek ran unopposed in this heavily Democratic district (CPVI=D+35).
Race ranking and details from CQ Politics
Campaign contributions from OpenSecrets

District 18

Republican incumbent Ileana Ros-Lehtinen has held this seat since 1989; however, her district has been increasingly trending Democratic in recent elections. The district contains many Miami suburbs and the entire Florida Keys. Founder and CEO of LanguageSpeak and Chair of the Women's Enterprise National Council's Leadership Forum Annette Taddeo was the Democratic nominee and was able to raise a  significant sum of money. Nonetheless, polls throughout the campaign showed Ros-Lehtinen in the lead. CQ Politics forecasted the race as 'Republican Favored'.
Race ranking and details from CQ Politics
Campaign contributions from OpenSecrets
Ros-Lehtinen (R-i) vs Taddeo (D) polls from Pollster.com

Results
Ileana Ros-Lehtinen defeated challenger Taddeo, receiving nearly 58 percent of the vote.

District 19

Democratic incumbent Robert Wexler, representing this district since 1997, faced Republican Edward J. Lynch and fellow Democrat Ben Graber, who chose to run as an independent candidate rather than compete against Wexler in the Democratic primary. Wexler had run opposed in the previous two elections. CQ Politics forecasted the race as 'Safe Democrat'.
Race ranking and details from CQ Politics
Campaign contributions from OpenSecrets

Results
Wexler retained his seat, receiving around 66 percent of the vote.

District 20

Democratic incumbent Debbie Wasserman Schultz (campaign website) has held this seat since 2005. Challengers Margaret Hostetter, who ran against Wasserman Schultz as a Republican in 2004 but chose to run as an independent in 2008, and Socialist write-in candidate Marc Luzietti (campaign website) were not expected to be serious threats to Wasserman Schultz. CQ Politics forecasted the race as 'Safe Democrat'.
Race ranking and details from CQ Politics
Campaign contributions from OpenSecrets

Results
As expected, Debbie Wasserman Schultz easily won reelection, receiving over 77 percent of the vote.

District 21

Republican incumbent Lincoln Diaz-Balart (campaign website) had faced little more than token opposition since taking office in 1993. This year, however, the race was expected to be much tougher for Diaz-Balart, as the Democratic nominee, former Hialeah Mayor Raul L. Martinez (campaign website), is very well known in the area and could be a formidable challenger. CQ Politics forecasted the race as 'Leans Republican'. Rothenberg rated it as 'Pure Toss-Up.' Cook rated it as 'Republican Toss-Up'. Bush won 57% of the vote here in 2004 (CPVI=R+6).

On May 22, 2008, Diaz-Balart did not attend a debate hosted by the South Florida AFL-CIO with Martinez due to scheduling and venue issues.

A July 7 poll conducted by a noted Democratic polster, Sergio Bendixen, showed Diaz-Balart ahead of Martinez by a four-point margin, 41 to 37 percent, with 22 percent undecided. David Hill, the Diaz-Balart brothers' pollster, said Lincoln's internal polling shows the congressman with a 12-point lead over Martinez and a "double-digit advantage over his opponent in virtually every significant segment of the electorate."

On August 1, 2008, a leading Washington analyst, Rothenberg Political Report, reported that they see a "possible re-election trouble for Lincoln Diaz-Balart". According to an August 14, 2008 Time article, Lincoln Diaz-Balart faces a competitive race. It also said that "Democratic voter registration in Miami-Dade County, as in other places, is up, and Republican registration is down."

On August 25, 2008, Lincoln Diaz-Balart agreed to debate Martinez, at a Greater Miami Chamber of Commerce event at noon on October 8.  On August 26, 2008, Martinez challenged Diaz-Balart to an additional debate in Denver, Colorado, which both candidates were visiting during the 2008 Democratic National Convention.

In a SurveyUSA poll sponsored by Roll Call conducted in August 2008, Martinez led Diaz-Balart (48% to 46%) among likely voters. According to the poll, Diaz-Balart enjoyed 70% support from Cuban-Americans in the district. The poll's demographics (which were chosen by the pollster in 2008) are different from those of the district (based on the US census of 2000.) 51% of those questioned were Hispanic (34% of respondents were Cuban and 17% were non-Cuban). The percentage of Hispanics in the district is higher at 69.7%. Later polls, however, showed Diaz-Balart back in the lead.
Race ranking and details from CQ Politics
Campaign contributions from OpenSecrets
Diaz-Balart (R-i) vs Martinez (D) polls from Pollster.com

Results
Despite predictions of a close election, Lincoln Diaz-Balart won reelection by a fairly comfortable margin, receiving just under 58 percent of the vote.

District 22

First-term Democratic incumbent Ron Klein was challenged by former army officer and Iraq War veteran Allen West. Michael Prysner, an Iraq War veteran, peace activist, and college student, ran as a write-in candidate on the Party for Socialism and Liberation ticket. CQ Politics forecasted the race as 'Democrat Favored'.

Republicans suffered a setback when popular former Boca Raton Mayor Steven Abrams announced he would not run. West and former navy pilot Mark Flagg announced they would run. Neurosurgeon Robert Brodner and 2006 Connecticut U.S. senatorial candidate Alan Schlesinger were also potential candidates. This Fort Lauderdale area district barely went to John Kerry in 2004 (CPVI=D+4). 
Race ranking and details from CQ Politics
Campaign contributions from OpenSecrets

Results
Ron Klein successfully defended his seat, receiving slightly less than 55 percent of the vote.

District 23

Democratic incumbent Alcee Hastings, who has held this seat since 1993, faced Republican Marion Dennis Thorpe Jr. in this heavily Democratic district. CQ Politics forecasted the race as 'Safe Democrat'.
Race ranking and details from CQ Politics
Campaign contributions from OpenSecrets

Results
Alcee Hastings easily retained his seat with over 82 percent of the vote.

District 24

Three-term Republican incumbent Tom Feeney (campaign website) faced Democrat nominee and former State Representative Suzanne Kosmas (campaign website) and independent Gaurav Bhola. On October 21, 2008, CQ Politics  switched its outlook on the race from "No Clear Favorite" to "Leans Democratic."

The district includes the Orlando suburbs as well as the Space Coast of Florida. In 2006, Feeney was re-elected by 58% to 42%. Although Feeney reportedly drew the district for himself while serving as speaker of the state house, the district is actually somewhat marginal on paper (CPVI=R+3). Bush took 55 percent of the vote in this district in 2004.
Race ranking and details from CQ Politics
Campaign contributions from OpenSecrets
Feeney (R-i) vs Kosmas (D) polls from Pollster.com

Results
Suzanne Kosmas ousted incumbent Tom Feeney, receiving around 57 percent of the vote. This district was one of two in Florida to switch from Republican to Democratic control in 2008, along with District 8.

District 25

Republican three-term incumbent Mario Diaz-Balart faced Miami-Dade County Democratic Party chairman Joe Garcia (campaign website), a former executive director of the Cuban American National Foundation (CANF). CQ Politics forecasted the race as 'Leans Republican'. The Rothenberg Political Report as 'Toss-Up/Tilt Republican'. The Cook Political Report as 'Republican Toss Up'. Bush won 56% of the vote here in 2004 (CPVI=R+4).

Garcia announced on February 7, 2008, his candidacy for the U.S. House of Representatives in Florida's 25th congressional district.

In March 2008, the Garcia's campaign announced that noted political strategist Joe Trippi, the campaign manager for 2004 presidential candidate and former Vermont governor Howard Dean, was joining the campaign team as Senior Media Adviser.

In April 2008, Garcia held a controversial fundraiser with Representative Charles B. Rangel, who has met repeatedly with Fidel Castro and pushed legislation that would allow U.S. citizens to travel to Cuba and allow American firms to do business there. Garcia said he "has serious disagreements with Rangel on Cuba. But having a relationship with the chairman of the powerful House Ways and Means Committee would help him bring federal money back to the district." Diaz-Balart claimed Garcia had a radical left-wing agenda including supporting higher taxes on working families and appeasing the nation's enemies.

An August 14, 2008 Time article labeled the race as competitive, pointing out that "Democratic voter registration in Miami-Dade County, as in other places, is up, and Republican registration is down".

According to many commentators, Garcia is Mario Diaz-Balart's most formidable political opponent ever because of the amount of money that he has raised and the national media attention that he has generated  Nonetheless, the Rothenberg Political Report  and CQ Politics  rated the seat as "Toss-up/Tilt Republican," the Cook Political Report  rated the district as "Likely Republican," and the Crystal Ball has rated the district as "Safe Republican" 

A poll of the race, that was conducted June 6 to 22, by noted Democratic pollster, Sergio Bendixen, showed Diaz-Balart ahead of Garcia 44 percent to 39 percent, with 17 percent undecided.

As of August 6, 2008, Garcia has raised $1,001,313 with $789,667 cash on hand for the 2007-2008 cycle. Mario Diaz-Balart, the five-year incumbent, has raised $1,188,193 and has $1,029,556 cash on hand during the same cycle.
Race ranking and details from CQ Politics
Campaign contributions from OpenSecrets
Diaz-Balart (R-i) vs Garcia (D) polls from Pollster.com

Results
Mario Diaz-Balart held off challenger Joe Garcia, receiving slightly more than 53 percent of the vote.

References

External links
Florida Division of Elections
U.S. Congress candidates for Florida at Project Vote Smart
Florida U.S. House Races from 2008 Race Tracker
Campaign contributions for Florida congressional races from OpenSecrets

2008
Florida
United States House of Representatives